Anthony Allen Ardizzone (born December 19, 1956) is a former American football offensive lineman in the National Football League (NFL) who played for the Chicago Bears. He played college football for the Northwestern Wildcats.

College career
Ardizzone attended and played college football at the Northwestern University from 1974–1977.

Professional career
Ardizzone was selected in the sixth round (#153 overall) of the 1978 NFL Draft by the Detroit Lions. He played all 16 games with the Chicago Bears in 1979.

Personal life
On April 1st, 2007; Ardizzone began a CertaPro Franchise in Glenview, Illinois. The Franchise, CertaPro Painters of the North Shore, has been accredited by the Better Business Bureau since September of 2009. The franchise is still owned by Ardizzone as of March 2023, marking 15 years in the painting business.

References 

1956 births
Living people
American football offensive linemen
Players of American football from Illinois
Sportspeople from La Grange, Illinois
Northwestern Wildcats football players
Chicago Bears players